Stade François Trausch is a football stadium in Mamer, in south-western Luxembourg.  It is currently the home stadium of FC Mamer 32.  The stadium has a capacity of 2,600.

References
World Stadiums - Luxembourg
Map of location on club website

Buildings and structures in Mamer
Francois Trausch